The geography of Australia encompasses a wide variety of biogeographic regions being the world's smallest continent, while comprising the territory of the sixth-largest country in the world. The population of Australia is concentrated along the eastern and south-eastern coasts. The geography of the continent is extremely diverse, ranging from the snow-capped mountains of the Australian Alps and Tasmania to large deserts, tropical and temperate forests, grasslands, heathlands and woodlands.

The countries that govern nearby regions include Indonesia, East Timor, and Papua New Guinea to the north; the Solomon Islands, Vanuatu, and the French dependency of New Caledonia to the east; and New Zealand to the southeast.

Physical geography
 

Australia is a country and an island located in Oceania between the Indian Ocean and the South Pacific Ocean. It shares its name with the country that claims control over it. Properly called the Commonwealth of Australia, its territory consists of the entire continent and smaller outlying islands. This makes it the sixth-largest country in the world by area of jurisdiction, which comprises  (including Lord Howe Island and Macquarie Island), which is slightly smaller than the 48 states of the contiguous United States and 31.5 times larger than that of the United Kingdom.

There are 758 estuaries around the country with most located in the tropical and sub-tropical zones. This EEZ does not include the Australian Antarctic Territory (an additional ).

Australia has the largest area of ocean jurisdiction of any country on Earth. It has no land borders. The northernmost points of the continental mainland are the Cape York Peninsula of Queensland and the Top End of the Northern Territory, but the northernmost point of the country lies in the Torres Strait Islands.

The western half of Australia consists of the Western Plateau, which rises to mountain heights near the west coast and falls to lower elevations near the continental centre. The Western Plateau region is generally flat, though broken by various mountain ranges such as the Hamersley Range, the MacDonnell Ranges, and the Musgrave Range. Surface water is generally lacking in the Western Plateau, although there are several larger rivers in the west and north, such as the Murchison, Ashburton, and Victoria rivers.

The Eastern Highlands, or Great Dividing Range, lie near the eastern coast of Australia, separating the relatively narrow eastern coastal plain from the rest of the continent. These Eastern Australian temperate forests have the greatest relief, the most rainfall, the most abundant and varied flora and fauna, and the densest human settlement.

Between the Eastern Highlands and the Western Plateau lie the Central Lowlands, which are made up of the Great Artesian Basin and Australia's largest river systems, the Murray-Darling Basin and the Lake Eyre Basin.

Off the north-eastern coast of Australia is the world's largest coral reef complex, the Great Barrier Reef. The large and mountainous island of Tasmania, also a State of Australia, lies south of the south-eastern corner of the Australian mainland. It receives abundant rainfall, and has highly fertile soils particularly in comparison to the mainland.

Geology

Australia is the lowest, flattest, and oldest continental landmass on Earth and it has had a relatively stable geological history. Geological forces such as tectonic uplift of mountain ranges and clashes between tectonic plates occurred mainly in Australia's early prehistory, when it was still a part of Gondwana.

Charles Rowland Twidale estimates that between 10% and 20% of Australia's modern landscapes formed during the Mesozoic when the continent was part of Gondwana.

Australia is situated in the middle of the tectonic plate, and therefore currently has no active volcanism. Minor earthquakes which produce no damage occur frequently, while major earthquakes measuring greater than magnitude 6 occur on average every five years. The terrain is mostly low plateau with deserts, rangelands and a fertile plain in the southeast. Tasmania and the Australian Alps do not contain any permanent icefields or glaciers, although these may have existed in the past. The Great Barrier Reef, by far the world's largest coral reef, lies a short distance off the north-east coast.

Regions

The Australian continental landmass consists of six distinct landform divisions.
These are:
 The Eastern Highlands—including the Great Dividing Range, the fertile Brigalow Belt strip of grassland behind the east coast, and the Eastern Uplands
 The Eastern alluvial Plains and Lowlands—the Murray Darling basin covers the southern part; also includes parts of the Lake Eyre Basin and extends to the Gulf of Carpentaria
 The South Australian Highlands—including the Flinders Range, Eyre Peninsula, and Yorke Peninsula
 The Western Plateau—including the Nullarbor Plain
 The Central Deserts
 Northern Plateau and Basins—including the Top End

Hydrology

Much of Australia's interior is arid; the low average annual rainfall and high temperatures mean interior rivers are often dry and lakes empty. The headwaters of some waterways are located in tropical regions where summer rains create a high rate of discharge. Flood events drastically alter the dry environment; thus the ecology of central Australia has had to adapt to the boom and bust cycle.

The Great Artesian Basin is an important source of water, the world's largest and deepest fresh water basin. Access to water from the basin has led to the expansion of grazing into areas that were previously far too dry for livestock. Towns and cities across the country sometimes face major water storage and usage crises in which restrictions and other measures are implemented to reduce water consumption. Water restrictions are based on a gradient of activities that become progressively banned as the situation worsens.

Billabong is the Australian name given to the oxbow lakes that can form along a meandering river's course. In a worldwide comparison of height, Australia's waterfalls are relatively insignificant, with the longest drop ranked 135th according to the World Waterfall Database.

Political geography

Australia consists of six states, two major mainland territories, and other minor territories. The states are New South Wales, Queensland, South Australia, Tasmania, Victoria, and Western Australia. The two major mainland territories are the Northern Territory and the Australian Capital Territory. Western Australia is the largest state, covering just under one third of the Australian landmass, followed by Queensland, South Australia, and New South Wales.

Australia also has several minor territories; the federal government administers a separate area within New South Wales, the Jervis Bay Territory, as a naval base and seaport for the national capital. In addition Australia has the following inhabited, external territories: Norfolk Island, Christmas Island, Cocos (Keeling) Islands, and several largely uninhabited external territories: Ashmore and Cartier Islands, Coral Sea Islands, and Heard Island and McDonald Islands.  Australia also claims a portion of Antarctica as the Australian Antarctic Territory, although this claim is not widely recognized.

Human geography

Australians have settled in several capital cities and their suburban satellites at various points along a vast coastline. A significant immigrant population occupied these places with relatively little dispute and few inner city ghettoes. Australia’s mean population density is 3.3/km2, one of the lowest in the world.

Sport plays an important social and cultural role in Australia with more than 90% of adults having an interest in sport. English is the most common language in Australia. Australians enjoy a very high rate of private property ownership. Australians have a preponderance to engage in gambling, experiencing the largest per capita losses in the world.

Climate

By far the largest part of Australia is arid or semi-arid. A total of 18% of Australia's mainland consists of named deserts, while additional areas are considered to have a desert climate based on low rainfall and high temperature. Only the south-east and south-west corners have a temperate climate and moderately fertile soil. The northern part of the continent has a tropical climate: part is tropical rainforests, part grasslands, and part desert.

Rainfall is highly variable, with frequent droughts lasting several seasons thought to be caused in part by the El Niño-Southern Oscillation. Occasionally a dust storm will blanket a region or even several states and there are reports of the occasional large tornado. Rising levels of salinity and desertification in some areas is ravaging the landscape.

Australia's tropical/subtropical location and cold waters off the western coast make most of western Australia a hot desert, with aridity a marked feature of the greater part of the continent. These cold waters produce little moisture needed on the mainland. A 2005 study by Australian and American researchers investigated the desertification of the interior, and suggested that one explanation was related to human settlers who arrived about 50,000 years ago. Regular burning by these settlers could have prevented monsoons from reaching interior Australia. The outback covers 70 percent of the continent.

Natural hazards
Cyclones along the northern coasts, severe thunderstorms, droughts, occasional floods, heat waves, and frequent bushfires are natural hazards that are present in Australia.

Environment

Current environmental issues include: soil erosion from overgrazing, industrial development, urbanization, and poor farming practices; soil salinity rising due to the use of poor quality water; desertification (partly as a result of the introduction by European settlers of rabbits); introduced pest species; clearing for agricultural purposes threatens the natural habitat of many unique animal and plant species; the Great Barrier Reef off the northeast coast, the largest coral reef in the world, is threatened by increased shipping and its popularity as a tourist site; limited natural fresh water resources; threats from invasive species.

International agreements:
 party to: Antarctic-Environmental Protocol, Antarctic Treaty, Kyoto Protocol, Biodiversity, China–Australia Migratory Bird Agreement, Climate Change, Endangered Species, Environmental Modification, Hazardous Wastes, Japan–Australia Migratory Bird Agreement, Law of the Sea, Marine Dumping, Marine Life Conservation, Nuclear Test Ban 1963, Nuclear Non-Proliferation, Ozone Layer Protection, Ship Pollution, Tropical Timber 1994, Ramsar Convention, Whaling
 signed, but not ratified: Desertification

See also 

 Australasian realm
 Australia-New Guinea
 List of cities in Australia by population
 List of extreme points of Australia
 List of islands of Australia
 List of lakes of Australia
 List of mountains in Australia
 List of regions of Australia
 List of rivers of Australia
 List of drainage basins of Australia
 List of valleys of Australia
 List of waterfalls of Australia
 Protected areas of Australia

References

Further reading

External links
 Map of Australia from 1826
 
 Water Usage in Australia